Lara Fernandez (born 1996) is a Spanish kickboxing and Muay thai. She is the reigning WBC Muaythai World Flyweight champion and the reigning ISKA World Super Featherweight champion.

Biography

Early career
Fernadez began training in kickboxing when she was 14. She is a supporter of Real Betis, and she credits the club with helping raise her popularity.

Fernandez faced Saskia D'Effremo for the vacant ISKA World Super Featherweight (−56.4 kg) championship at Fight Night III on November 5, 2016. She lost the fight by unanimous decision.

Fernandez faced Gloria Peritore at War of Titans on September 23, 2017. She lost the fight by unanimous decision.

Fernandez faced Maribel de Sousa at Masters Series V on November 11, 2017. She won the fight by unanimous decision.

At Enfusion 68, held on June 9, 2018, Fernandez challenged Iman Barlow for the Enfusion 54 kg title. Fernandez lost the fight by a unanimous decision. During Enfusion 72, held on October 6, 2018, she lost a unanimous decision against Lizzie Largillière, despite rallying in the last two rounds.

Fernandez faced Maite Botella for the FEKM Spanish (−53 kg) Championship at Xtreme Fight Show on June 23, 2018. She won the fight by unanimous decision.

Fernandez was booked to face Lilit Dallakyan at Mix Fight 42 on July 17, 2019. She won the fight by a unanimous decision.

Fernandez won the vacant ISKA World K-1 Rules Super Featherweight title on November 30, 2019, with a unanimous decision win over Kelly Denoiko. She made her first title defense of the ISKA title at WLF World Cup 2019-2020 Final, held on January 11, 2020, against Li Mingrui. She won the fight by a unanimous decision.

Fernandez faced Grace Spicer for the vacant WBC Muaythai World Flyweight title at Combat Fight Series 4 on March 9, 2020. Fernandez won the fight by a closely contested unanimous decision after five rounds.

Fernandez was scheduled to fight Amy Pirnie for the Lion Fight super-flyweight Championship at Lion Fight 68 on August 22, 2021. She lost the fight by split decision.

ONE Championship
Fernandez signed with ONE Championship on May 4, 2022. Fernandez was booked to make her promotional debut against the ONE Women's Atomweight Kickboxing World champion Janet Todd for the interim ONE Women's Atomweight Muay Thai World Championship on July 22, 2022, at ONE 159. She lost the fight by unanimous decision.

Fernandez faced Dangkongfah Banchamek on December 3, 2022, at ONE 164. She won the bout via split decision.

Championships and accomplishments

Amateur
International Federation of Muaythai Associations
 2021 IFMA World Championships -54 kg 
 2022 IFMA European Championships -54 kg

Professional
World Boxing Council Muaythai
WBC Muaythai World Flyweight (−52 kg) Championship
International Sport Kickboxing Association
ISKA World Super Featherweight (−56.4 kg) K-1 Championship (One successful title defense)

Awards
Combat Press
2020 "Female Fighter of the Year" nominee

Fight record

|-  bgcolor="#CCFFCC"
| 2022-12-03 || Win ||align=left| Dangkongfah Banchamek || ONE 164: Pacio vs. Brooks || Pasay, Philippines || Decision (Split) || 3 || 3:00 
|-  bgcolor="#FFBBBB"
| 2022-07-22 || Loss ||align=left| Janet Todd || ONE 159: De Ridder vs. Bigdash || Kallang, Singapore || Decision (Unanimous) || 5 || 3:00
|-
! style=background:white colspan=9 |
|-  bgcolor="#FFBBBB"
| 2021-08-22 || Loss ||align=left| Amy Pirnie || Lion Fight 68|| Glasgow, Scotland || Decision (Split) || 5 || 3:00
|-
! style=background:white colspan=9 |
|-  bgcolor="#CCFFCC"
| 2020-03-09|| Win||align=left| Grace Spicer || Combat Fight Series 4 || London, England || Decision (Unanimous) || 5 || 2:00
|-
! style=background:white colspan=9 |
|-
|-  bgcolor="#CCFFCC"
| 2020-01-11 || Win||align=left| Li Mingrui || WLF World Cup 2019-2020 Final || Zhuhai, China || Decision (Unanimous) || 3 || 3:00
|-
! style=background:white colspan=9 |
|-
|-  bgcolor="#CCFFCC"
| 2019-11-30 || Win||align=left| Kelly Denoiko  || K-1 ISKA || Brussels, Belgium || Decision (Unanimous) || 5 || 2:00
|-
! style=background:white colspan=9 |
|-
|-  bgcolor="#CCFFCC"
| 2019-07-17 || Win||align=left| Lilit Dallakyan || Mix Fight 42 || Yerevan, Armenia || Decision (Unanimous) || 5 || 2:00
|-
|-  bgcolor="#CCFFCC"
| 2018-06-23 || Win||align=left| Maite Botella || Xtreme Fight Show || Mérida, Spain || Decision (Unanimous) || 5 || 3:00
|-
! style=background:white colspan=9 |
|-
|-  bgcolor="#FFBBBB"
| 2018-10-06 || Loss||align=left| Lizzie Largillière || Enfusion 72 || Madrid, Spain || Decision (Unanimous) || 5 || 2:00
|-
|-  bgcolor="#FFBBBB"
| 2018-06-09 || Loss||align=left| Iman Barlow || Enfusion 68 || Newcastle, England || Decision (Unanimous) || 5 || 2:00
|-
! style=background:white colspan=9 |
|-
|-  bgcolor="#CCFFCC"
| 2017-11-11 || Win||align=left| Maribel de Sousa  || Masters Series V || Bilbao, Spain || Decision (Unanimous) || 5 || 3:00
|-
|-  bgcolor="#fbb"
| 2017-09-23 || Loss ||align=left| Gloria Peritore || War Of Titans || Barcelona, Spain || Decision (Unanimous) || 5 || 3:00
|-
|-  bgcolor="#fbb"
| 2017-03-04 || Loss ||align=left| Rita Carvalho || Kryssing World Serie || Seville, Spain || Decision (Unanimous) || 5 || 3:00
|-
|-  bgcolor="#FFBBBB"
| 2016-11-05 || Loss||align=left| Saskia D'Effremo || Fight Night III || Singen, Germany || Decision (Unanimous) || 5 || 3:00
|-
! style=background:white colspan=9 |
|-
|-  bgcolor="#FFBBBB"
| 2015-11-06 || Loss||align=left| Estela García || HGH Promotions || Alhaurín de la Torre, Spain || Decision (Unanimous) || 5 || 3:00
|-
|-  bgcolor="#FFBBBB"
| 2011-11-16|| Loss||align=left| Sophie Hawkswell || HGH Promotions || Leeds, England || Decision (Unanimous) || 5 || 3:00
|-
|-
| colspan=9 | Legend:    

|-  bgcolor="#FFBBBB"
| 2022-02-18 || Loss ||align=left| Victoria Kuvikina || 2022 IFMA European Championship, Semi Final|| Bangkok, Thailand || Decision (30:27) || 3 || 3:00
|-
! style=background:white colspan=9 |
|-  bgcolor="#FFBBBB"
| 2021-12-10 || Loss ||align=left| Sveva Melillo || 2021 IFMA World Championship, Semi Final|| Bangkok, Thailand || Decision (29:28) || 3 || 3:00
|-
! style=background:white colspan=9 |

|-  bgcolor="#cfc"
| 2021-12-09 || Win ||align=left| Gabriela Kuzawinska || 2021 IFMA World Championship, Quarter Final|| Bangkok, Thailand || Decision (30:27) || 3 || 3:00

|-  bgcolor="#cfc"
| 2021-12-08 || Win ||align=left| Valeryia Novikava || 2021 IFMA World Championship, Round of 16|| Bangkok, Thailand || Decision (30:24) || 3 || 3:00
|-
|-  bgcolor="#cfc"
| 2016-03-09 || Win ||align=left| Natasha Hingley || The Prodigy || Birmingham, England || Decision (Unanimous) || 3 || 3:00
|-
|-  bgcolor="#FFBBBB"
| 2015-12-06 || Loss ||align=left| Tamara Fallon || Rising Up 5 || Manchester, England || Decision (Unanimous) || 3 || 3:00
|-
|-  bgcolor="#FFBBBB"
| 2014-11-08 || Loss ||align=left| Lubena Jane Iske || Muaythai Mayhem || England ||  ||  || 
|-
|-
| colspan=9 | Legend:

See also
List of female kickboxers

References 

Spanish kickboxers
1996 births
Living people
ONE Championship kickboxers
Sportspeople from Toledo, Spain
Spanish Muay Thai practitioners